Les Soirées de Paris was a French literary and artistic review founded in February 1912 by Guillaume Apollinaire and four of his associates - André Billy, René Dalize, André Salmon, and . It was last published in August 1914.

Contributors

Editors 
 First series
Guillaume Apollinaire ;  ; René Dalize ; André Billy ; André Salmon ; Maurice de Waleffe ; Jacques Dyssord ; Charles Perrés; Marcel Duminy ; Roch Grey ; J. De L'esc ; Jérôme Tharaud ; Adolphe Paupe ; Eugène Montfort ; Fernand Divoire ; Tristan Derème ; Bernard Combette ; Marc Henry ; Peter Altember ; Borgne Le Crocheteur ; Henry Céard ; Adolphe Lacuzon ; Charles-Léon Bernardin ; Émile Zavie ; Francis Carco ; George Sabiron ; Doniazade ; Sébastien Voirol ; Vincent Muselli ; Émile Magne ; Jean Pellerin ; Maurice Raynal ; Jean Paulhan.

 Second series
Guillaume Apollinaire ; Jean Cerusse ; André Billy ; Léonard Pieux ; Jacques Dyssord ; Max Jacob ; René Bizet ; René Dalize ; Roch Grey ; Émile Zavie ; Maurice Raynal ; Fernand Fleuret ; Horace Holley ; Gabrielle Buffet ; Mireille Havet; Jacques Dyssord ; André Dupont ; Dominique Combette ; Adolphe Basler ; Henri Rousseau ; Edgard Varèse ; Fernand Divoire ; Giovanni Papini ; Harrison Reeve ; Henri Hertz ; Jean Le Roy ; Pierre Henner ; Louis Rive ; Paul Visconti ; Vincent Muselli ; Jean Royère ; Blaise Cendrars ; Alberto Savinio ; Albert Haas ; Henri Strentz ; Guy-Pierre Fauconnet ; Ambroise Vollard ; Ardengo Soffici ; Fernand Léger ; O. -W. Gambedoo ; F. S. Flint ; Gabriel Arbouin ; Mireille Havet ; Léopold Sturzwage ; Georges Rouault; Alan Seeger.

Illustrators 
Pablo Picasso (No. 18); Marie Laurencin (No. 19); Henri Matisse (No. 19, 24); Jean Metzinger (No. 19); Albert Gleizes (No. 19); Henri Rousseau (No. 20); André Derain (No.21); Francis Picabia (No. 22); Georges Braque (No.23); Archipenko (No. 25); Fernand Léger (No. 26&27); Marius de Zayas (No. 26&27); Maurice de Vlaminck (No. 26&27); Georges Rouault (No. 26&27).

References

Defunct literary magazines published in France
French art publications
Magazines established in 1912
Magazines disestablished in 1914